Acts of Supremacy is the second full-length studio album by the Italian melodic death metal band Neptune. The album was released on April 11, 2008 through Noisehead Records and is distributed by Relapse Records in North America. A video was made for "Machinegun Revolution".

Track listing
 "Stereogram of Convulsion" − 5:24
 "Gearsouls' Supremacy" − 5:05
 "Sterile Gods" − 4:55
 "Machinegun Revolution" − 4:48
 "Dormant Slaves' Resurrection" − 5:56
 "Black Monolith Sunrise" − 5:24
 "Kevlar-B48" − 5:47
 "Cluster" − 4:08
 "Disequilibrium" − 6:45

Credits
 Mattia Nidini − vocals
 Francesco Moro − guitar
 Andrea Mameli − guitar
 Francesco Adami − bass
 Corrado Zoccatelli − drums

2007 albums
Neptune (Italian band) albums